The 1999 Lehigh Mountain Hawks football team was an American football team that represented Lehigh University during the 1999 NCAA Division I-AA football season. Lehigh was co-champion of the Patriot League, but lost in the first round of the Division I-AA national playoffs.

In their sixth year under head coach Kevin Higgins, the Mountain Hawks compiled a 10–2 record. Ian Eason, Kevin Joseph, Brett Snyder and Phil Stambaugh were the team captains.

The Mountain Hawks outscored opponents 478 to 220. Lehigh's 5–1 conference record tied for best in the seven-team Patriot League standings. The co-championship represented Lehigh's first back-to-back Patriot title, and its fourth first-place finish of the 1990s.  

The Mountain Hawks were ranked No. 19 in the preseason Division I-AA national poll, and remained ranked throughout the year, rising as high as No. 7 and finishing the year at No. 14. Though co-champion Colgate was given the Patriot League's automatic berth in the Division I-AA playoffs, Lehigh earned an at-large berth. Both Patriot League playoff teams lost in the first round.

Lehigh played its home games at Goodman Stadium on the university's Goodman Campus in Bethlehem, Pennsylvania.

Schedule

References

Lehigh
Lehigh Mountain Hawks football seasons
Patriot League football champion seasons
Lehigh Mountain Hawks football